Eros Roque Pérez Salas (born 3 June 1976) is a Chilean former footballer, manager and journalist.

Club career
Pérez started playing football at Palestino lower divisions, where was promoted to first-adult team in 1994. After completing three goals in 85 appearances playing for the club until mid-2000, the incoming year he moved to Argentina’s Colón de Santa Fe to face the 2000–01 Argentine football season.

Once finished that season, he left Colón and joined Brazilian giants Internacional de Porto Alegre. However, after only playing three league games and didn’t play during the national cup due to an injury, he returned to Argentina, joining Gimnasia La Plata, where he also failed to have continuity, playing only six league games.

For the 2002–03 season, Pérez signed for Lanús, making 22 appearances. Nevertheless the next season, he moved to Skoda Xanthi from Greece. There he played 17 games and scored one time.

In mid-2004, he returned his homeland, joining Chilean powerhouse Universidad Católica. At Católica, Pérez became an unmovable player and team’s captain, he helped the club to win the 2005 Torneo Clausura and to reach that season’s Copa Sudamericana semifinals. He completed a total of twelve goals in 132 appearances during his period between 2004 and 2009 and was one of the referents during that seasons alongside players like Jorge Ormeño or the keeper José María Buljubasich.

After finishing his contract with Universidad Católica, on 18 December 2009, it was reported that Pérez joined Unión San Felipe, freshly promoted to top-level in the age. His first goal came in his debut against Colo-Colo in a 3–2, where scored a 30-meter goal.

In 2011, he signed for Ñublense, being presented in a friendly match against Audax Italiano where both team draw 2–2. At the end of the season he announced his retirement from football.

Coaching career
In 2020, he worked as the coach of Lautaro de Buin at under-20 level, next he moved to Deportes Melipilla as the Head Coach of the youth ranks. In 2021, he coached Deportes Melipilla as a caretaker during the promotion playoff to Primera División due to the Head Coach, John Armijo, tested positive by COVID-19.

Post-retirement
From 2012 to 2019, Pérez performed as a football commentator and analyst for the Chilean TV channel Canal del Fútbol. At the same time, he coached the football team of Colegio Emaus.

Honours

Club
Universidad Católica
 Primera División de Chile: 2005 Clausura

References

External links
 
 

1976 births
Living people
Footballers from Santiago
Chilean footballers
Chile international footballers
Chilean expatriate footballers
Club Deportivo Palestino footballers
Club Atlético Colón footballers
Sport Club Internacional players
Club de Gimnasia y Esgrima La Plata footballers
Club Atlético Lanús footballers
Xanthi F.C. players
Club Deportivo Universidad Católica footballers
Unión San Felipe footballers
Ñublense footballers
Chilean Primera División players
Argentine Primera División players
Campeonato Brasileiro Série A players
Super League Greece players
Chilean expatriate sportspeople in Argentina
Chilean expatriate sportspeople in Brazil
Chilean expatriate sportspeople in Greece
Expatriate footballers in Argentina
Expatriate footballers in Brazil
Expatriate footballers in Greece
2001 Copa América players
Association football defenders
Chilean football managers
Deportes Melipilla managers
Primera B de Chile managers
Chilean association football commentators
Canal del Fútbol color commentators
Chilean sports journalists
Chilean journalists